Doc is an American medical drama with strong Christian undertones starring Billy Ray Cyrus as Dr. Clint "Doc" Cassidy, a Montana doctor who takes a job in a New York City medical clinic. It aired from March 11, 2001 to November 28, 2004 on Pax TV.

Although set in New York City, the series was shot in and around Toronto, Ontario, Canada. 88 episodes were produced.

Plot summary
Doc follows rural doctor Clint "Doc" Cassidy who has taken a position at Westbury Clinic, a small medical center in New York City. Doc is a young Christian bachelor from the mountains of Montana, who brings his small-town values and ideology to an environment that seems to lack familiarity with them.

Supporting characters include the doctors, nurses and other staff of Westbury Clinic; a 10-year-old orphan, Raúl García; and a young couple, Nate and Beverly Jackson, who live in the same apartment building as Clint.

Themes
Each episode has three interconnecting plot lines; the predominant plot line follows Clint and his involvement in the lives of his patients. Another plot line involves Clint's relationship with his clinic coworkers, and the third involves the Jackson family. In later seasons, the Jackson family plot line or the clinic plot line is occasionally left out in preference to the predominant Clint one. The plot lines are then resolved at the end of each episode, when Clint writes an email to his guardian, Doc Johansson, back in Montana.

Characters

Westbury Clinic

 Dr. Clint "Doc" Cassidy (Billy Ray Cyrus) is a kindhearted doctor from Montana who has moved to New York to work at Westbury Clinic, a medical center adjacent to the local hospital. He initially left Montana to be with his girlfriend Samantha (Claudette Mink), but he breaks up with her in the pilot because they're from different worlds. Clint has a love for God and for people, making him a popular doctor at the clinic. He often likes to insert some bits of wisdom from Montana into the clinic team's activity. It is mentioned in some episodes that Clint's parents died when he was young; he was taken in by his hometown's doctor, Doc Johansson. This adoption leads to Clint's love for medicine. He is the show's main character.
 Nancy Nichols (Andrea C. Robinson) is a young nurse who is smart, energizing, and a bit vain. She possesses good bedside manners, common sense, and a sharp wit. She isn't afraid to speak her mind. Nancy's parents divorced when she was 12, and Nancy had a touching reunion with her mother, who had cancer at the time. This reunion, and the mother eventually succumbing to her cancer, were the focuses of two episodes of the shows. She and Clint have a mutual relationship that is thefocus of several episodes. Clint proposes to her in the final episode and she says "yes".
 Dr. Derek Hebert (Derek McGrath) is a portly, witty, insightful doctor who is a very good friend of Clint's. Derek is friends with all of the clinical team (with the exception of Dr. Crane) and, despite his soft-spoken personality, never afraid to get involved in anything the clinic is involved in. Derek has a wife, Nellie, and a daughter, Gracie. He fears small rodents, especially rats and mice.
 Donna Dewitt (Ruth Marshall) is the clinic-hospital administrator. She combines a warm heart with a focus on the bottom line. Her occasional role as an antagonist as a result of her goal of cutting costs contrasts with her warmth, approachability and unfailing support of the rest of the staff.
 Dr. Oliver Crane (Ron Lea) is frequently the antagonist of the series. He is egotistical and selfish, and usually more concerned with his individual convenience and getting recognition from peers (especially outside of the clinic) than with his patients. He is also a schemer in a sense, trying to get money and compliments, but these almost always fail. But despite his mean, outspoken personality, Oliver did soften slightly toward the end of the show's run.
 Tippy Williams, later Tippy Doss (Paula Boudreau), appears in the pilot episode, and joins Westbury later in the first season. She thinks differently than most people, and often comes across as a bit of a dimwit. She keeps the team on their toes in a silly, geeky way, but shining through Tippy's somewhat woolly mind is a heart of gold that loves, sacrifices, and longs to learn.

Jackson Family

 Nate Jackson (Richard Leacock) is an officer with the New York Police Department. Nate Jackson is initially skeptical of Clint's country ways, but the two become close friends quickly. Nate is also a building supervisor, and arranges an apartment for Clint. He affectionately gives Clint the nickname "Country".
 Raul Garcia (Tyler Posey) is an orphaned boy who is 8 years old when the series starts and around 11–12 when it ends. He and his single mother were homeless, and they slept in the basement of a New York church before Mrs. Garcia became ill and died. Despite attempts to take Raul into custody by his abusive father, Raul ends up getting adopted by Nate and Beverly Jackson. He is a normal preteen boy who gets instruction on making wise choices from and his parents and from Clint, among others.
 Beverly Jackson (Tracy Shreve) is Nate's caring, conscientious wife who teaches at Raul's school. She gets pregnant in the first half of season three and gives birth to baby Mattie at the season's end.

Other supporting characters
 Justin (Demetrius Joyette) is Raul's best friend from school. They're good friends who often hang out together. Justin is a bit younger than Raul and sometimes lacks his older friend's good sense.
 Elliot (Taylor Abrahamse) is an aspiring violinist, but somewhat of a nerd. Raul and Justin are reluctant to hang out with him at first, but they soon come to learn that he is a good friend indeed.
 Steve "The Captain (later 'Major')" Doss (Kevin Jubinville) is a soldier in the U.S. Army who falls in love with Tippy and eventually marries her. He is generally good-natured and very army savvy (he speaks in the manner of a soldier on duty), but he has a tendency to be turgid and act irrationally.
 Jelly Bean (Kenny Robinson) and Junior (Billy Otis) are street Peddlers and good friends of Clint's. When they first met they tried to rob Clint but he stopped them and helped them change their ways.
 Dr. Harley Johanson (Neil Dainard) Is a mentor and friend to Clint Cassidy. He lives in Montana and is one of Clint's Best friends. Clint sees Harley as a father figure. Clint often e-mail's Harley at the end of each episode. He appears in 23 episodes.

Notable guest stars

 Christian singer Steven Curtis Chapman appears in the season two episode "Fearless", as Raul's music teacher, Daniel Parson
 Cyrus' real-life daughter Miley Cyrus appears in three episodes; her on-screen acting debut in the Pilot (Part one; uncredited) as Kylie in season two, episode eight (credited as Destiny Hope); and in season four, episode six as Raul's friend; Cyrus's daughter Noah Cyrus appears in six episodes as Gracie Hebert
Michael Cera appears in two season two episodes as Max, a distraught preteen boy whose parents are on the edge of divorce
Sue Thomas appears in season five, episode seven
 Christian singer Jaci Velasquez appears in the season five episode "Nip, Tuck & Die"
 Christian singer CeCe Winans appears in season three, episode seven as Rosalyn Franklin, a poor Black widow whose young son has leukemia

Episodes

Season 1 (2001)

Season 2 (2001–02)

Season 3 (2002–03)

Season 4 (2003–04)

Season 5 (2004)

Broadcast
Doc was broadcast on PAX TV and has Christian undertones. It was written by Dave Alan Johnson and Gary R. Johnson. The producers and writers were also involved with the series Sue Thomas: F.B.Eye. PAX TV, which had become Ion Television, resumed airing reruns October 1, 2007, only to take it off the air again November 16, 2007.

It was rebroadcast throughout 2005 on Network Ten in Australia on Saturday mornings at 4:00am.

During 2006, Doc was shown on the Canadian Showcase cable television specialty channel, Monday through Friday at 10:00am and 6:00pm. It also aired in Spanish on Mexico's National Broadcast channel at 10:30 pm Sunday through Friday. As of June 2012, it airs on VisionTV weekdays at 2 p.m.

In the United States, Doc has aired on Gospel Music Channel and on Hallmark Channel. It began airing on BYUtv weekdays at Noon and 6 PM January 16, 2012.

GetTV reran the series from July–September 22, 2017.

Home media
On February 3, 2004, PAX Home Entertainment (Distributed by Ventura Distribution) released Season 1 of Doc on Region 1 DVD.

References

External links
 
 

2000s American drama television series
2001 American television series debuts
2004 American television series endings
2000s American medical television series
Christian entertainment television series
English-language television shows
PAX TV original programming
Television shows filmed in Toronto
Television shows set in New York City